This is a list of members of the Victorian Legislative Council at the election of 2 June 1910, up to the election of 3 June 1913. As half of the Legislative Council's terms expired at each triennial election, half of these members were elected at the 1907 triennial election with terms expiring in 1913, while the other half were elected at the 1910 triennial election with terms expiring in 1916.

The Electoral Provinces Boundaries Act 1903 defined 17 Provinces with two members each for a total of 34 members.

Note the "Term in Office" refers to that members term(s) in the Council, not necessarily for that Province.

John Mark Davies was President; Arthur Sachse was Chairman of Committees.

 Embling died 24 May 1912; replaced by William Angliss in June 1912.
 Harwood died 29 April 1912; replaced by Horace Richardson
 Luxton died 5 September 1911; replaced by Henry Skinner in September 1911 who died 14 February 1912; replaced by Arthur Robinson in March 1912.
 Miller left the Council in January? 1913; replaced by James Merritt in September 1913.

References

 Re-member (a database of all Victorian MPs since 1851). Parliament of Victoria.

Members of the Parliament of Victoria by term
20th-century Australian politicians